Ripton is a town in Addison County, Vermont, United States. The population was 739 at the 2020 census.

Geography

Ripton is located in east-central Addison County, in the Green Mountains of Vermont. The highest point in the town is the  summit of Bread Loaf Mountain. The mountain lends its name to the community of Bread Loaf and to the writers' conference that is held there every summer. Although the approach to Middlebury Gap begins in Ripton, the Gap's height-of-land is in neighboring Hancock.

Ripton is bordered by the town of Middlebury to the west, Bristol and Lincoln to the north, Granville to the east, Hancock to the southeast, Goshen to the south, and Salisbury to the southwest.

Ripton is mountainous and largely populated by northern hardwood forest.

Events
The Bread Loaf Writers' Conference is held annually in Ripton. Jessica Ravitz of CNN said that the town "is the kind of place where cell service fails more often than it works and the country store is really just that....Tibetan prayer flags wave outside a weather-worn home, and the fog lifts to reveal a white horse grazing in a field".

Demographics

At the 2000 census, there were 556 people, 210 households and 152 families residing in the town.  The population density was 11.2 per square mile (4.3/km2). There were 283 housing units at an average density of 5.7 per square mile (2.2/km2). The racial makeup of the town was 97.66% White, 0.18% African American, 0.18% Native American, 0.36% Asian, 0.18% from other races, and 1.44% from two or more races. Hispanic or Latino of any race were 0.54% of the population.

There were 210 households, of which 38.1% had children under the age of 18 living with them, 56.2% were married couples living together, 11.4% had a female householder with no husband present, and 27.6% were non-families. Of all households 22.4% were made up of individuals, and 5.7% had someone living alone who was 65 years of age or older. The average household size was 2.54 and the average family size was 2.89.

Age distribution was 26.1% under the age of 18, 6.3% from 18 to 24, 30.4% from 25 to 44, 29.0% from 45 to 64, and 8.3% who were 65 years of age or older. The median age was 38 years. For every 100 females, there were 113.0 males. For every 100 females age 18 and over, there were 106.5 males.

The median household income  was $39,583, and the median family income was $47,813. Males had a median income of $36,250 versus $30,893 for females. The per capita income for the town was $19,597.  About 10.3% of families and 15.6% of the population were below the poverty line, including 25.2% of those under age 18 and 7.4% of those age 65 or over.

Notable people 

 Robert Durst, multi-millionaire and convicted murderer lived in Ripton in 1971–1972
 Robert Frost, poet
 Bill McKibben, environmentalist and climate change author

References

External links
 Town of Ripton official website
 Bread Loaf Writer's Conference
 Robert Frost's connection to Ripton

 
Towns in Addison County, Vermont
Towns in Vermont